Gibara is a town and municipality of the Province of Holguín in the Republic of Cuba. Gibara is the fourth largest town by population and the ninth by area in Holguín.

History

The main town was founded on January 16, 1817. It is also known as "The White Town", . Gibara has a beautiful and breezy landscape, and also possesses excellent architectural designs and a well-planned layout of its streets, houses and parks. Even so, Gibara's biggest asset, according to visitors, are its people, which are described as cooperative, friendly, affectionate, and proud of their village and of its history. It is said Admiral Christopher Columbus had remarked of Gibara's environs that "it is the most beautiful land that human eyes saw."

"The White Villa" in Gibara, although small, is said to possess a peculiar charm, exhibiting an architectural patrimony reflecting almost two centuries of history, as well as its people's cultural roots. Currently, some controversy exists about whether it was the Bay of Gibara or the Bay of Bariay that Columbus' ships reached during his first voyage to Cuba.  The island of Cuba was discovered on October 28, 1492, after the disembarkation of La Pinta, La Niña and La Santa María, the first three European ships under the command of Columbus during his first trip toward the New World.

Gibara was declared a National Monument in 2002; additionally, since 2003, the International Festival of Cinema, where films are presented in a number of different categories, has been held in this small coastal town.

Demographics
In 2004, the municipality of Gibara had a population of 72,810.

The municipality is divided into the barrios of Arroyo Blanco, Blanquizal, Bocas, Candelaria, Cantimplora, Cupeycillos, Palmita, Rabón.

See also
List of cities in Cuba
Municipalities of Cuba

References

External links

Populated places in Holguín Province